Cevdet Kerim İncedayı (1893 – 19 May 1951) was an Ottoman-born Turkish army officer, politician and author.

Biography 
Born in 1893 in Sinop, he studied at the Gülhane Military Medical Academy and graduated in 1914. He was sent to the Caucasus front during World War I. After the war, he joined the Turkish nationalist movement in Ankara and took part in the Greco-Turkish War as part of the 7th Division. After the war, he retired from the army at the rank of Major and started a career in politics shortly after.

He was elected a member of the Grand National Assembly in 1935, from Sinop, and would serve for 16 years until his death in 1951. In November 1940, he became the 2nd Minister of Transport and held that office until November 1941. 5 years later, in August 1946, he served as the Minister of Public Works until September 1947.

During his lifetime, he wrote two books about the Turkish War of Independence:
Türk İstiklâl Harbi Garp Cephesi (1926)
İnkılâp ve İstiklâl (1936)

References

1893 births
1951 deaths
Republican People's Party (Turkey) politicians
Date of birth unknown
People from Sinop, Turkey
People from Kastamonu vilayet
Government ministers of Turkey
Ministers of Transport and Communications of Turkey
Ministers of Public Works of Turkey
Turkish Army officers
Ottoman military personnel of World War I
Turkish military personnel of the Greco-Turkish War (1919–1922)
Members of the 5th government of Turkey
Members of the 6th government of Turkey
Members of the 7th government of Turkey
Members of the 8th government of Turkey
Members of the 9th government of Turkey